Mathew Karedas (born Mathew J. Hannon) is an American actor, best known for his role as Joe Marshall in the 1991 cult film Samurai Cop.

Career

Mathew Karedas was one of Sylvester Stallone's bodyguards during the late 1980s. This subsequently inspired him to pursue acting. "In Sly's world, it's a very rarefied air for the very wealthy – it's intoxicating. At that time, he'd just finished Rambo III and Tango & Cash and spending all that time hanging out with all these celebrities, I decided I wanted to have at least 1% of what he had!"

Karedas was unable to get any substantial roles after Samurai Cop and withdrew from the entertainment industry for two decades. In 1992 he took part in an armed robbery stealing a Rembrandt painting from televangelist Gene Scott's University Cathedral in Los Angeles. The painting was found in the home of Kourosh Jadali, a stunt coordinator who worked on the set of Samurai Cop. Karedas was later arrested and sent to prison. He was largely unaware of the cult status that Samurai Cop had attained over the proceeding years.

Karedas has stated that he would check his IMDb page and noticed that many people assumed that he was dead, although this may have been due to him legally changing his surname to Karedas in the early-1990s. Karedas stated in an interview with RedLetterMedia that he was satisfied with the public thinking he was dead. He would regain attention when his daughter uploaded a video to YouTube of him saying that he was indeed alive. He has since returned to acting, reprising his role as Joe Marshall in the 2015 film Samurai Cop 2: Deadly Vengeance. He is connected to Len Kabasinski's 2022 action film Pact of Vengeance which also stars Leo Fong.

Personal life 
He resides in Calabasas, California, with his wife and daughter.

Filmography

Film

Television

References

External links
 

Living people
American male film actors
Year of birth missing (living people)